Zetyovo may refer to:

 In Bulgaria (written in Cyrillic as Зетьово):
 Zetyovo, Burgas Province - a village in the Aytos municipality, Burgas Province
 Zetyovo, Stara Zagora Province - a village in the Chirpan municipality, Stara Zagora Province